Aylin Acar (born July 21, 1995) is a Turkish volleyball player. She is part of the Turkey women's national volleyball team.

Personal life
Aylin Sarıoğlu was born in Aydın, Turkey on July 21, 1995. Currently, she is a student at the Sports Academy of Uludağ University in Bursa.

Playing career

Club
Sarıoğlu started to play volleyball at the age of nine joining her hometown club Bursa Büyükşehir Belediyespor. In the 2011–12 season, she was admitted o the senior team, and became professional. She  enjoyed her team's promotion to the Turkish Women's Volleyball League, and played at the CEV Women's Challenge Cup in 2013–14, 2014–15, 2015–16, 2016–17 and 2017–18 with her team. She enjoyed her team's twice gold (2014–15, 2016–17), once silver (2017–18) and once bronze medal (2015–16).

After Bursa BB folded in 2018, Sarıoğlu signed with the another Bursa-based club Nilüfer BS for the 2018–19 season.

International
Sarıoğşu was admitted to the Turkey women's national volleyball team first time in 2018. She played at the 2018 FIVB Volleyball Women's Nations League with the national team, which won the silver medal.

Honours

Club 
 Champions (2) 2014–15 CEV Women's Challenge Cup (Bursa BB),
2016–17 CEV Women's Challenge Cup (Bursa BB)
 Runners-up (1) 2017–18 CEV Women's Challenge Cup (Bursa BB)
 Third places (1) 2015–16 CEV Women's Challenge Cup (Bursa BB)

International 
 Runners-up (1) 2018 FIVB Volleyball Women's Nations League

References

Living people
1995 births
Sportspeople from Bursa
Bursa Uludağ University alumni
Turkish women's volleyball players
Nilüfer Belediyespor volleyballers
Turkey women's international volleyball players
VakıfBank S.K. volleyballers